A dossier is a collection of papers or other sources, containing detailed information about a particular person or subject.

Dossier can also refer to:

Arts, entertainment, and media
 Dossier 51, a 1978 film based on a book of the same name
 Dossier Journal, an independently published and owned bi-annual arts and culture journal
 The Miernik Dossier, first of seven novels by American novelist Charles McCarry

Specific dossiers
 Farewell Dossier, documents that a KGB defector gave to the French DST in 1981–82
 Iraq Dossier, a 2003 briefing document for the British Labour Party government concerning Iraq and weapons of mass destruction
 September Dossier, a document published by the British government on 24 September 2002 concerning weapons of mass destruction (WMD) in Iraq
 Steele dossier, a dossier containing allegations of a conspiracy between Trump's 2016 campaign and the Russian government, sometimes known as the "Trump–Russia dossier"
 Westminster paedophile dossier, a dossier on paedophiles allegedly associated with the British government

Other uses
 Dossier criminal, a term used by Indian police forces to classify criminals
 Global Dossier, an online public service launched in June 2014 by the five Intellectual Property offices

See also
 Black Dossier (disambiguation)